Benson Rayfield McLendon Jr. (August 10, 1945 – July 4, 2022) was an American professional golfer who played on the PGA Tour in the 1960s and 1970s.

McLendon was born in Atlanta, Georgia. He graduated from Louisiana State University in Baton Rouge and was a member of the golf team.

McLendon turned pro in 1968 and won the first event he entered, the Magnolia State Classic. He won four PGA Tour events during his career. His best finish in a major championship was T22 at the 1968 U.S. Open. He retired from the PGA Tour in 1980.

McLendon resided in Birmingham, Alabama. He died on July 4, 2022, at age 76.

Amateur wins
1965 SEC Championship (individual)
1966 SEC Championship (individual)
1967 SEC Championship (individual)

Professional wins (6)

PGA Tour wins (4)

PGA Tour playoff record (1–0)

Other (2)
1968 Magnolia State Classic
1975 Waterloo Open Golf Classic

Results in major championships

Note: McLendon never played in The Open Championship.

CUT = missed the half-way cut
"T" = tied

References

External links

American male golfers
LSU Tigers golfers
PGA Tour golfers
Golfers from Atlanta
Golfers from Birmingham, Alabama
1945 births
2022 deaths